Heroes in Black is a Singaporean television series loosely inspired by a Chinese short story in Xie Shi (諧史) by the Song dynasty writer Shen Shu (沈淑). The story is about a thief known as "Wolaiye" (我来也; literally "Here I Come") who stole from many wealthy households in the capital during the Southern Song dynasty. In this series, "Wolaiye" is the alter ego of a constable, who teams up a magistrate to fight injustice in the county. Both of them also become love rivals because they both fall in love with a lady boss of a restaurant. The series was produced by MediaCorp and starred Bobby Au-yeung, Li Nanxing and Fann Wong in the lead roles. It was first aired on MediaCorp Channel 8 in Singapore in 2001.

Plot
The main character in the series is a masked thief called "Wolaiye" (literally "Here I Come") who steals from corrupt officials in a city, Zhencheng, to help the poor. The citizens regard him as their hero. Wolaiye is actually the alter ego of Song Dou, a constable who works in Zhencheng's administrative office. Song Dou aspires to serve his country but feels disappointed when he sees that the government is dominated by corrupt officials, so he decided to become a vigilante while pretending to be a constable at the same time.

Feng Pobu is an official famous for his literary talent and unyielding personality. The Chancellor, who dislikes him, slanders him in front of the Emperor and causes him to be demoted and sent out of the capital to serve as an adviser to the magistrate of Zhencheng. When Feng Pobu discovers that the magistrate has been stealing national treasures and selling them to foreigners, he teams up with Song Dou and Prince Kang to stop the magistrate and expose his misdeeds. The magistrate is sacked and Feng Pobu replaces him as the new magistrate of Zhencheng. Feng Pobu continues to work together with Song Dou to bring peace to the citizens in Zhencheng.

Song Dou and Feng Pobu gradually develop a love rivalry because they fall in love with the same woman: Liu Feiyan, the lady boss of a famous restaurant. Feng Pobu is attracted to her fiery personality and wants to marry her. However, she already has a crush on Wolaiye. Song Dou also has romantic feelings for Liu Feiyan, but is hesitant to reveal his identity as Wolaiye to her.

The evil Chancellor is aware that the Emperor, who is childless, has the intention of abdicating the throne to his brother Prince Kang. He comes up with a scheme to turn the Emperor and Prince Kang against each other in the hope that they will destroy each other so that he can become the next emperor. At the same time, he also discovers that Song Dou's foster son, Doudou, is actually the Emperor's son because the Emperor had a secret affair with a commoner. He then sends his henchmen to kill Doudou.

The Emperor falls for the Chancellor's ruse, mistakenly believes that Prince Kang is plotting against him, and orders his brother's execution. On the execution day, Song Dou, Feng Pobu, Liu Feiyan and their friends show up and manage to convince the Emperor that Prince Kang is innocent. They also bring along Doudou, who has survived the attack by the Chancellor's henchmen. The Emperor realises his folly so he removes the Chancellor from office, pardons Prince Kang and passes the throne to him. The newly enthroned Prince Kang intends to reward Song Dou and Feng Pobu by granting them titles and honours, but they reject his offers because they are only interested in winning Liu Feiyan's hand-in-marriage. The story ends with Liu Feiyan undecided on whether she should marry Song Dou or Feng Pobu while the two men debate on who can bring happiness to her.

Cast
 Bobby Au-yeung as Feng Pobu
 Li Nanxing as Wolaiye / Song Dou
 Fann Wong as Liu Feiyan
 Zheng Peipei as Feng Pobu's mother
 Deng Maohui as Doudou
 Apple Hong as Liu Feiyu
 Vincent Ng as Fan Yuan
 Yan Bingliang as the Chancellor
 Liang Tian as the Emperor
 Li Wenhai as Prince Kang
 Richard Low as Lu Da
 Ye Shipin as Lu Er
 Zhou Quanxi as the Magistrate

External links
 Heroes in Black on MediaCorp's website

2001 Singaporean television series debuts
2001 Singaporean television series endings
2000s Singaporean television series
Singapore Chinese dramas
Singaporean wuxia television series
Channel 8 (Singapore) original programming